Bermingham is a surname, and may refer to:

 Alan Bermingham (born 1944), English former professional footballer
 Ann Bermingham (born 1948), American art historian
 Anne Bermingham (1925–2006), Australian chemist
 Brendan Bermingham (born 1956), Irish retired sportsperson
 Brendon Bermingham (1914–1975), Australian rules footballer
 Brian Bermingham, former Irish Fine Gael politician and former Cork City Council member
 David Bermingham (born 1962), English banker, part of the Natwest Three
 Debra Bermingham (born 1953), American artist
 Edward Bermingham, 13th Baron Athenry (died 1709), Anglo-Irish lord
 Edward J. Bermingham (1887–1958), American investment banker
 Ellis Bermingham, Countess of Brandon (1708–1789)
 Erin Bermingham (born 1988), New Zealand cricketer
 Francis Bermingham (fl. 1652), Irish Franciscan friar and scholar
 Gerry Bermingham (born 1940), British politician
 Ian Bermingham (born 1989), Irish footballer
 James Bermingham, Bishop of Killala
 James Bermingham (1849–1907), Member of the Irish Republican Brotherhood (IRB)
 Jennifer Bermingham, American professional golfer
 Jimmy Bermingham, Irish soccer player
 John Michael Bermingham (1905–1942), US Navy officer
 John Bermingham (1923–2020), American politician
 Joseph Bermingham (1919–1995), Irish politician
 Joseph Bermingham (priest) (1801–1874), Irish Anglican priest
 Karl Bermingham (born 1985), Irish footballer
 Margaret Ball (born Margaret Bermingham, 1515–1584), Irish Catholic martyr
 Mick Bermingham, Irish hurler
 Paddy Bermingham (athlete) (1886–1959), Irish police officer and sportsman
 Paddy Bermingham (footballer) (1904–1970), Irish footballer
 Philip Bermingham ( 1420–1490), Irish judge
 Rachael Bermingham, Australian entrepreneur, author, public speaker
 Thérèse Bermingham, Irish former Vice-Chairman of the World Scout Committee
 Thomas Bermingham (priest) (1918–1998), American Jesuit priest, teacher and scholar
 Thomas Bermingham, 1st Earl of Louth (1717–1799), Anglo-Irish politician and peer
 Willie Bermingham (1942–1990), Irish firefighter and campaigner, who founded A.L.O.N.E.

See also 
Bermingham (surname), for an article about the name
Bermingham Castles of Ireland
Birmingham (disambiguation)